Rancho Del Mar High School is one of three public high schools on the Palos Verdes Peninsula (the others being Palos Verdes Peninsula High School and Palos Verdes High School). Located on Crest Road in Rolling Hills, the school is part of the Palos Verdes Peninsula Unified School District.

Rancho Del Mar was opened in 1984 on the former site of La Cresta Elementary School.

With a relatively small enrollment, Rancho Del Mar High School focuses on students who experience difficulty with the regular high school environment or curriculum. It is a common secondary destination for those struggling with behavioral or academic issues at either Palos Verdes or Palos Verdes Peninsula High School. Enrollment is only granted through administrative recommendation.

References

High schools in Los Angeles County, California
Educational institutions established in 1984
Palos Verdes Peninsula Unified School District
Public high schools in California
1984 establishments in California